Farm to Market Road 2004 (FM 2004) is a farm to market road in Brazoria and Galveston counties, Texas.

Route description
FM 2004 begins near the village of Jones Creek and the TDCJ Clemens Unit prison, at an intersection with  SH 36; the roadway past SH 36 is  FM 2611. The route travels to the northeast, crossing the Brazos River and entering Lake Jackson, where it intersects  SH 332 and then the  SH 288 expressway north of Brazos Mall. FM 2004 travels through Richwood before entering unincorporated areas of Brazoria County, south of Danbury and Liverpool, and north of the Brazoria National Wildlife Refuge. The highway crosses a steep bridge over Chocolate Bayou and passes chemical plants before entering Galveston County. The route turns more to the north, crossing  SH 6 in Hitchcock. The route begins a brief concurrency with  FM 1764 in La Marque just prior to a junction with I-45. FM 1764 turns to the east past the I-45 junction, while FM 2004 resumes its northerly route through Texas City, passing of Mall of the Mainland before ending at  SH 3.

In 2005, the Brazoria County section of FM 2004, from the Galveston County line to SH 36, was designated the Jason Oliff Memorial Highway in honor of Brazoria County Sheriff Deputy Jason Oliff. Oliff was killed on December 5, 2005, while placing flares in front of the BP Amoco plant on FM 2004 just southwest of the FM 2917 intersection.

History
FM 2004 was first designated in Galveston County on December 17, 1952; its routing then was from SH 3 FM 1765. On January 16, 1953, the road extended south to SH 6, replacing the section of FM 1765 south of its western terminus. It was extended to FM 1561 on June 28, 1963. The road was extended to SH 288 in Brazoria County on October 8, 1964, replacing most of FM 1561, which was cancelled. The remainder of FM 1561 north to SH 6 became part of FM 646. The southern terminus saw two more changes: a short extension from SH 288 to SH 332 in Lake Jackson on June 1, 1965, and an extension to the current terminus at SH 36 on September 29, 1977. TxDOT edited the designation by September 17, 1979, to indicate a discontinuity at FM 1764 (which had been there since designation); that amendment was repealed from the official description on October 16, 1989.

On June 27, 1995, the mileage of the section between SH 3 and SH 6 was transferred to Urban Road 2004 (UR 2004). The designation of that section reverted to FM 2004 with the elimination of the Urban Road system on November 15, 2018.

Major intersections

See also

References

2004
Transportation in Brazoria County, Texas
Transportation in Galveston County, Texas